J.Dhukilan is a Singaporean footballer who plays for Young Lions FC as a defender. He was part of the U15 team which played in the inaugural YOG Games.

After being released by the NFA, he moved on to Geylang International in 2015 to play for their prime league squad.  In 2016, he was promoted to the 1st team.  He was later called up by FAS to join the Young Lions FC in the midseason of 2016.

Club career

Geylang International
J.Dhukilan was part of the Sleague squad for the Eagles after being promoted to the squad.

Young Lions FC
He transferred to the team after FAS called him up to the Young Lions FC.

Career statistics

References

1997 births
Living people
Singaporean footballers
Singapore Premier League players
Association football defenders
Young Lions FC players